Tunisia (TUN) competed at the 1987 Mediterranean Games in Latakia, Syria.

Nations at the 1987 Mediterranean Games
1987
Mediterranean Games